Carolyn Koch (born June 7, 1967) is an American sports shooter. She competed in the mixed trap event at the 1988 Summer Olympics.

References

External links
 

1967 births
Living people
American female sport shooters
Olympic shooters of the United States
Shooters at the 1988 Summer Olympics
Place of birth missing (living people)
21st-century American women